Clyde is a city in Cloud County, Kansas, United States.  As of the 2020 census, the population of the city was 694.  It is located east of Concordia along state highway K-9.

History
Clyde was laid out in 1867, making it the oldest town in Cloud County. It was named after the River Clyde in Scotland, or according to another source, it was named for Clyde, Ohio (which also is named indirectly for the River Clyde).

Clyde experienced growth in 1877 when the Central Branch Railroad was built through it.

Geography
Clyde is located at  (39.591694, -97.397833).

Demographics

2010 census
As of the census of 2010, there were 716 people, 297 households, and 194 families residing in the city. The racial makeup of the city was 97.8% White, 0.3% African American, 0.3% Asian, 0.3% from other races, and 1.4% from two or more races. Hispanic or Latino of any race were 0.7% of the population.

There were 297 households, of which 26.9% had children under the age of 18 living with them, 56.6% were married couples living together, 4.0% had a female householder with no husband present, 4.7% had a male householder with no wife present, and 34.7% were non-families. 30.3% of all households were made up of individuals, and 17.9% had someone living alone who was 65 years of age or older. The average household size was 2.31 and the average family size was 2.90.

The median age in the city was 46.7 years. 22.8% of residents were under the age of 18; 6.6% were between the ages of 18 and 24; 19% were from 25 to 44; 25.1% were from 45 to 64; and 26.5% were 65 years of age or older. The gender makeup of the city was 47.9% male and 52.1% female.

2000 census
As of the census of 2000, there were 740 people, 319 households, and 200 families residing in the city. The racial makeup of the city was 99.73% White and 0.27% Native American. Hispanic or Latino of any race were 0.27% of the population.

There were 319 households, out of which 25.7% had children under the age of 18 living with them, 57.1% were married couples living together, 4.1% had a female householder with no husband present, and 37.0% were non-families. 34.8% of all households were made up of individuals, and 24.5% had someone living alone who was 65 years of age or older. The average household size was 2.23 and the average family size was 2.88.

In the city, the age distribution of the population shows 23.1% under the age of 18, 6.6% from 18 to 24, 20.1% from 25 to 44, 20.3% from 45 to 64, and 29.9% who were 65 years of age or older. The median age was 45 years. For every 100 females, there were 85.9 males. For every 100 females age 18 and over, there were 82.4 males.

The median income for a household in the city was $31,343, and the median income for a family was $39,167. Males had a median income of $29,286 versus $19,063 for females. The per capita income for the city was $17,852. About 1.0% of families and 4.5% of the population were below the poverty line, including 3.9% of those under age 18 and 8.3% of those age 65 or over.

Education
The community is served by Clifton-Clyde USD 224 public school district, which has three schools:
 Clifton-Clyde Senior High School, located in Clyde.
 Clifton-Clyde Middle School, located in Clifton.
 Clifton-Clyde Grade School, located in Clifton.

The Clifton-Clyde High School mascot is Eagles. Prior to school unification in 1981, the Clyde High School mascot was Bluejays.

The Clifton Cardinals won the state 1A football championship in 1969

The Clyde Bluejays won the Kansas State High School 1A Football championship in 1977 and the boys 1A Basketball championship in 1979.

Notable people
 George Dockins, Major League Baseball pitcher for the St. Louis Cardinals (1945) and Brooklyn Dodgers (1947).
 Louis M. Mollier (1846–1911), pioneer Roman Catholic priest for the Vicariate of Kansas (1874–1876), Diocese of Leavenworth (1877–1887), and Diocese of Concordia (later Salina) (1887–1911).

See also
 National Register of Historic Places listings in Cloud County, Kansas
 Charles W. Van De Mark House – currently a private residence, is listed on the National Register of Historic Places
 Central Branch Union Pacific Railroad
 Concordia Blade-Empire

References

Further reading

External links
 City of Clyde
 Clyde - Directory of Public Officials
 , from Hatteberg's People on KAKE TV news
 Clyde city map, KDOT

Cities in Kansas
Cities in Cloud County, Kansas